R v DeSousa [1992] 2 S.C.R. 944, is the Supreme Court of Canada case where the Court determined the Constitutionally required level for mens rea for the charge of "unlawfully causing bodily harm". The case is one of a series of cases including R. v. Hundal and R. v. Creighton where the Court reduced the requirement for culpability for a number of crimes.

Background 
Shortly before midnight, during a New Year party in Toronto on December 31, 1987, a fight broke out. Several people started throwing bottles including Joao DeSousa who threw a bottle that ricocheted off the wall and hit Teresa Santos in the forearm causing serious harm. 

DeSousa was charged with unlawfully causing bodily harm contrary to s.269 of the Criminal Code.

The issue before the Court was whether s.269 of the Criminal Code violated the s.7 of the Charter as it potentially allowed for prison sentences for "Absolute Liability" offences (which was deemed unconstitutional in Re B.C. Motor Vehicle Act).

Ruling 
Justice Sopinka, writing for the Court, held that s.269 did not violate s.7.

The charge itself is broken down into two separate requirements. First, there must be an underlying offence (the "unlawful act") with a valid mens rea requirement. This includes provincial and federal offences, criminal or otherwise, but precludes any absolute liability offences. Secondly, the "unlawful act" must be at least "objectively dangerous" so that a reasonable person would realize that the act created a risk of bodily harm. Due to the lack of stigma or any sort of significant prison sentence attached to the offence it did not warrant a higher "subjective fault" requirement (R. v. Martineau).

The Court dismissed the argument that the offence would punish the morally innocent by not requiring proof of intention to bring about the consequences. Instead the offence aims to prevent objectively dangerous acts (this justification was elaborated on in R. v. Creighton).

See also
 List of Supreme Court of Canada cases

External links
 

Supreme Court of Canada cases
Section Seven Charter case law
1992 in Canadian case law
Canadian criminal case law